Fullerton is an unincorporated community (part of northern Overlea) in Baltimore County, Maryland, United States.  The area is often considered part of Nottingham, despite being part of Overlea.  Fullerton residents have either 21236 or 21206 as their ZIP code.

History

In 1976, Fullerton Elementary School was established.  The school colours are green and yellow, and the mascot is a mouse.  As of 2014, the school served 553 pre-K-to-fifth-grade students and employed thirty-three teachers.  The attendance rate in 2011 and 2012 was equal to or greater than 95 percent.  Every Independence Day, a fireworks show is put on at Fullerton Park, a field adjacent to the school.2013 Schedule of Fireworks Displays,

The movie theatre Beltway Movies 6 (located in the Belair Beltway Plaza shopping centre) was featured in the 2000 John Waters film Cecil B. Demented.

There was a major fire at an empty building owned by the Schmidt Baking Company on Fitch Lane in Fullerton in April, 2008.

In 2013, police received numerous complaints about rowdy teens being loud and destructive around a roller rink known as Skate Land, located behind the local Denny's.  The troubles prompted the county to withhold renewal of the venue's amusement hall license; the county had also threatened to revoke the hall's skating license.  After negotiations with the county, Skate Land is now only permitted to hold parties and events Monday through Thursday, and only until 9 P.M.

Locations in Fullerton

Major roads
U. S. Route 1 (Belair Road)
I-95 (J.F.K. Memorial Highway)
I-695 (Baltimore Beltway)

Other roads
Fullerton Avenue
Kenwood Avenue (MD 588)
Lillian Holt Drive
Perry Hall Boulevard
Putty Hill Avenue
Rossville Boulevard
White Marsh Boulevard (MD 43)

Shopping centres

Belair Beltway Plaza
Beltway Movies 6 (movie theatre)
Carrabba's Italian Grill (formerly a movie theatre, and before that a Sizzler)
Fullerton Animal Hospital (veterinarian)
M&T Bank
Overlea Personal Physicians (formerly a grocery store)
Verizon Wireless (formerly a Blockbuster)

Fullerton Plaza
Weis Markets #206 (formerly Big Kmart #3517)
IHOP #555 (formerly a Bob's Big Boy)
McDonald's #20966
Mr. Tire #733

Putty Hill Plaza
Bank of America
Dunkin' Donuts
Giant #0144 (grocery store)

Parks
Belmar Park
Fullerton Park
Lillian Holt Park and Center for the Arts
Linover Park

Churches
Kenwood Presbyterian Church
St. Joseph Church
St. Michael the Archangel Church

Other locations
Baltimore County Central Alarmers #155 (fire department)
Chesley Place (home of the Natural History Society of Maryland)
Fullerton Community Center
Fullerton Dental Care
Fullerton Elementary School
Fullerton Manor Bingo (bingo hall)
Fullerton Mini Storage (self-storage facility)
Fullerton Pub & Crab House
Fullerton Reservoir
Gardens of Faith Memorial Gardens (cemetery)
Lassahn Funeral Home
Overlea-Fullerton Recreation Center
Overlea Fullerton Senior Center
Sipple Farm
Skate Land (roller rink)

References

Unincorporated communities in Baltimore County, Maryland
Unincorporated communities in Maryland